The Devil's Advocate, originally released as Des Teufels Advokat, is a 1977 West German English-language drama film, directed by Guy Green (his final theatrical film) and based on the 1959 novel of the same name by the Australian writer Morris West.

It stars John Mills, Paola Pitagora, Stéphane Audran, Leigh Lawson, Jason Miller and Daniel Massey. The film is set in Italy but was filmed predominantly in Bavaria.

Plot
In 1958, the Catholic Church is investigating the case of a mysterious individual, Giacomo Nerone (Leigh Lawson), who is said to have performed miracles in a remote village in Southern Italy (Scontrone), before being executed by Italian Communist partisans in 1944.  The process involves a "Devil's advocate", who is tasked with discovering any details about the subject's life which would indicate that canonisation would be inappropriate.

Monsignor Blaise Meredith (John Mills) is given this responsibility, shortly after he learns he has terminal cancer.  Meredith discovers that Nerone was actually a British soldier named James Black, who had become detached from the British Army during World War II and was hiding in this village, where he began a relationship with a local woman.

The film touches on homosexuality, priests cohabiting, the Italian Holocaust, and other sensitive topics.

Cast
 John Mills as Monsignor Blaise Meredith
 Stéphane Audran as Anne, Contessa di Sanctis 
 Jason Miller as Dr Aldo Meyer
 Paola Pitagora as Nina Sanduzzi
 Leigh Lawson as James Black aka Giacomo Nerone
 Timothy West as Father Anselmo
 Patrick Mower as Il Lupo
 Raf Vallone as Bishop Aurelio
 Daniel Massey as Nicholas Black
 Romolo Valli as Cardinal Marotta

Production
Morris West wrote the screenplay from his novel of the same name. In January 1976 J. Lee Thompson was announced as director.

References

External links
 

1977 films
1977 drama films
1970s English-language films
English-language German films
Films about Catholicism
Films based on works by Morris West
Films directed by Guy Green
Films set in 1958
Films set in Italy
West German films
German drama films
1970s German films